Huang Shouhong (born June 1964) is a Chinese politician who is the current director of the State Council Research Office, in office since July 2016.

He is a representative of the 19th National Congress of the Chinese Communist Party and a member of the 19th Central Committee of the Chinese Communist Party.

Biography
Huang was born in Fan County, Henan, in June 1964. He graduated from Beijing Agricultural University (now China Agricultural University) and the Graduate School of Chinese Academy of Agricultural Sciences.

He was appointed as an official in the State Council Research Office in 1993 and over a period of 23 years worked his way up to the position of director in 2016.

References

1964 births
Living people
People from Puyang
China Agricultural University alumni
People's Republic of China politicians from Henan
Chinese Communist Party politicians from Henan
Members of the 19th Central Committee of the Chinese Communist Party
Members of the 20th Central Committee of the Chinese Communist Party